Natsagiin Udval is a Mongolian politician. She has been the secretary general of the Mongolian People's Revolutionary Party since 2010. She is the country's Health Minister. She was a candidate for the 2013 Mongolian presidential election, being the first woman to do so. Udval supports former president Nambaryn Enkhbayar who is in prison on corruption charges.

Incumbent President Tsakhiagiin Elbegdorj, candidate of the Democratic Party,  won the 2013 Mongolian presidential election on June 26, 2013 with 50.23 percent of total votes while Mongolian People's Party candidate Badmaanyambuugiin Bat-Erdene got 41.97 percent, and Natsagiin Udval got 6.5 percent of total votes.

As health minister, Udval's only notable work has been a change to the prisoners' medical treatment rule which allowed former President Nambaryn Enkhbayar, who was convicted of corruption charges, to spend less than a month in prison and spend most of his two and a half year jail term as a patient at the Second General Hospital, where high-ranking government officials are medically treated.

References

External links
Natsag Udval Official Website 

1954 births
Living people
People from Arkhangai Province
Mongolian People's Party politicians
Women government ministers of Mongolia
21st-century Mongolian women politicians
21st-century Mongolian politicians
Health ministers of Mongolia